Launch Complex 18 (LC-18) is a launch complex at the Cape Canaveral Space Force Station, Florida that was active during the late 1950s and early 1960s. It was used by Viking, Vanguard, Thor and Scout rockets. The complex consists of two launch pads, LC-18A, which was originally built by the US Navy for the Vanguard rocket, and LC-18B, which was originally by the US Air Force used for tests of the PGM-17 Thor missile. 

The first launch from LC-18 was a Viking rocket from LC-18A on 8 December 1956, on a test flight for Project Vanguard. A further Viking launch was conducted in May 1957, and the Vanguard made its maiden flight from the complex in September. Following this, the United States first satellite launch attempt was made from LC-18A, using Vanguard TV3, on 6 December 1957. The launch failed after the rocket lost thrust and exploded on the launch pad. All twelve Vanguard launches were conducted from LC-18A, with the complex being transferred to NASA after it took over responsibility for Vanguard following its formation in 1958. After the Vanguard's retirement in 1959, LC-18A was transferred to the US Air Force for use by Scout rockets.

LC-18B was used for 17 tests of Thor missiles between 4 June 1958 and 29 February 1960. Following this, it was also converted for use by Scout rockets.

Sixteen Scouts were launched from LC-18; ten from LC-18A and six from LC-18B. Fifteen of the launches were suborbital sounding flights, and one was an orbital launch with the Mercury-Scout 1 satellite for NASA. This failed to reach orbit and was destroyed by range safety 43 seconds after launch. The launches from LC-18A used the Blue Scout Junior configuration, and were conducted between 21 September 1960 and 9 June 1965. The launches from LC-18B consisted of three Blue Scout I rockets and three Blue Scout IIs, launched between 7 January 1961 and 12 April 1967.

References
 

Cape Canaveral Space Force Station